Robert Gray Allen (August 24, 1902August 9, 1963) was an American businessman and a two-term Democratic member of the U.S. House of Representatives from Pennsylvania from 1937 to 1941.

Early life and education
Allen was born in Winchester, Massachusetts on August 24, 1902. He moved to Minneapolis, in 1906.  He was graduated from Phillips Academy at Andover, Massachusetts, in 1922 and later attended Harvard College in Cambridge, Massachusetts. He moved to Greensburg, Pennsylvania in 1929 and was a salesman and sales manager for a valve and fittings manufacturing business until 1937.

Political and military career
He was district administrator of the Works Progress Administration in 1935 and 1936.

Allen was elected as a Democrat to the Seventy-fifth and Seventy-sixth Congresses.  He was not a candidate for renomination in 1940.  He became president of the Duff-Norton Manufacturing Company in Pittsburgh, from 1940 to 1943.  He was commissioned a major in the United States Army Ordnance Corps in July 1942 and was promoted to lieutenant colonel in February 1943. He served until his discharge in January 1945.

After his time in Congress and the Army, he served in a variety of business positions:
Baldwin Locomotive Works (Sales manager) from 1945 to 1946
Fisher Plastics Corporation (Vice President) in Boston, Massachusetts from 1946 to 1947
Great Lakes Carbon Corporation (Vice President) from 1947 to 1954
Pesco Products (President), a division of Borg-Warner Corporation, from 1954–1957
Bucyrus-Erie Company (Vice President in 1957 - 1958, and president in 1958)
Bucyrus-Erie Co. of Canada, Ltd. (chairman of the board and president)
Ruston-Bucyrus, Ltd., Lincoln, England (chairman of the board)
Director of the First National Bank of Milwaukee, Wisconsin.

He retired from business activities in 1962 and moved from Milwaukee, to Keene, Virginia, where he died.

Family and personal life
Allen married Katharine Hancock Wilson on January 17, 1925.  Together, they had three children.

In 1948, Allen's daughter, Katharine "Kathy" Allen, married Warren A. Morton (1924–2002), an oilman in Casper who later served as Speaker of the Wyoming House of Representatives from 1979–1980 and was the unsuccessful Republican gubernatorial nominee in 1982. Katharine Morton recalls that though her father had been a New Deal supporter, he opposed U.S. President Franklin D. Roosevelt's Judiciary Reorganization Bill of 1937 and also ran afoul of United Mine Workers labor figure John L. Lewis.

References

 Retrieved on 2008-01-26
The Political Graveyard

1902 births
1963 deaths
20th-century American businesspeople
20th-century American politicians
20th-century American Episcopalians
American chairpersons of corporations
United States Army officers
Democratic Party members of the United States House of Representatives from Pennsylvania
United States Army personnel of World War II
American bankers
Harvard College alumni